The Snake River is a  tributary of the St. Croix River in east-central Minnesota in the United States. It is one of three streams in Minnesota with this name. Its name is a translation from the Ojibwa Ginebigo-ziibi, after the Dakota peoples who made their homes along this river. Kanabec County's name is derived from the Ojibwe word for this river.

Course
The Snake River with its tributaries drains a  area of Aitkin, Kanabec, Mille Lacs and Pine counties. After initially flowing southward from its headwaters in southern Aitkin County, the Snake flows through Kanabec County, turning eastward near Mora, Minnesota, following a minor fault line.
At Pine City, the river measures approximately 650 cubic feet per second.

Associated lakes and tributaries
Two lakes are associated with the Snake River, Cross Lake and Pokegama Lake. Major tributaries of the Snake River are the Knife River, Ann River, Groundhouse River, and Rice Creek.

Culture
The Snake and the Knife rivers served as the main waterway to connect the St. Croix River with Mille Lacs Lake. As recorded by Henry Schoolcraft, Chief Kappamappa made his home at Chengwatana at the mouth of the Snake. A stream near the outlet of Pokegama Lake is called Mission Creek, for a Presbyterian mission which brought the first printing press to Minnesota, to print literature in the Ojibwe language. During the treaty-making periods, this river was inhabited by the Biitan-akiing-enabijig ("Border-sitters") who were both Ojibwa and Dakota. The Biitan-akiing-enabijig had numerous internal skirmishes as they defined themselves as either Ojibwa or Dakota, giving a false perspective that the Mdewakanton Dakota Sioux and Ojibwa Nations were at constant war. Eventually, the Biitan-akiing-enabijig who defined themselves as Ojibwa became part of the St. Croix Band of Lake Superior Chippewa, and the Snake River sub-band subsequently became part of the St. Croix Chippewa Indians of Minnesota, one of the four constituent tribes of the Mille Lacs Band of Ojibwe.

The North West Company fur trade post was established on the river in 1804, near present Pine City. The post was used for several years, then abandoned and destroyed in a fire. The site was later rediscovered and excavated. The rowhouse and palisade fence were reconstructed and opened up as a living history museum in 1970.

Together with Cross Lake and the Knife River, the 1757 edition of the Mitchell Map identifies this river system as "Portage River" as it served as the waterway that connected the St. Croix River with Mille Lacs Lake and the upper Mississippi River, via a short portage.

See also
 List of rivers of Minnesota
 Minnesota Department of Natural Resources

References

 Cordes, Jim (1989).  Pine County ... and its memories.  North Branch: Jim Cordes.
 Waters, Thomas F. (1977).  The Streams and Rivers of Minnesota.  Minneapolis: University of Minnesota Press.  .

Rivers of Minnesota
Rivers of Aitkin County, Minnesota
Rivers of Kanabec County, Minnesota
Rivers of Mille Lacs County, Minnesota
Rivers of Pine County, Minnesota
Tributaries of the St. Croix River (Wisconsin–Minnesota)